Emesia Chizunga (born 3 March 1954) is a Malawian middle-distance runner. She competed in the women's 800 metres at the 1972 Summer Olympics. She was the first woman to represent Malawi at the Olympics.

References

1954 births
Living people
Athletes (track and field) at the 1972 Summer Olympics
Malawian female middle-distance runners
Olympic athletes of Malawi
Place of birth missing (living people)